Dračevica is a village in the municipality of Studeničani, North Macedonia.

Demographics
According to the 2021 census, the village had a total of 305 inhabitants. Ethnic groups in the village include:

Albanians 268 
Macedonians 1
Others 36

References

External links

Villages in Studeničani Municipality
Albanian communities in North Macedonia